Cassandra Hager-Smith (born January 17, 1984) is an American former college basketball player.  She is the only player in the history of the University of Northern Iowa to record than 1,000 career points and 1,000 rebounds.

Career
Cassandra Hager was born on January 17, 1984, in Perry, Iowa, to Daniel Hager and Michelle Hager. Her Siblings are Katrina and Caley.

Perry High School
Hager says she didn't start playing basketball until she was in 5th grade.

She attended high school in Perry, Iowa, where she was named first team all-state in her junior and senior years and twice earned Des Moines Sunday Register first-team all-state honors. In her last two seasons she averaged more than 20 points a game.

In Hager's senior year, Perry won the state Class 3-A championship. She graduated in 2002.

College highlights
In her senior year, Hager was the second leading shot-blocker in Division I, averaging 4.3 blocks per game.
 Missouri Valley Conference Defensive Player of the Year (2006)
 All-MVC First Team (2006,2005)
 MVC All-Defensive Team (2005)
 MVC All-Tournament Team (2006,2005)
 All-time MVC career leader
 Only player in UNI history to record 1,000 career points and rebounds

Northern  Iowa statistics

Source

References

External links
 Northern University Iowa
 WNBA Prospect

Centers (basketball)
1984 births
American women's basketball players
Living people
People from Perry, Iowa
21st-century American women